is a Japanese manga series written and illustrated by Kimitake Yoshioka. It has been serialized in Kodansha's online platform Comic Days since September 2018. An anime television series adaptation by Gekkō is set to premiere in 2023.

Characters

Media

Manga
Written and illustrated by Kimitake Yoshioka, TenPuru started in Kodansha's online platform Comic Days on September 1, 2018. Kodansha has collected its chapters into individual tankōbon volumes. The first volume was released on July 5, 2019. As of January 23, 2023, eight volumes have been released.

In June 2020, it was announced that BookWalker Global partnered with Kodansha USA to release the manga in English language, and the first two volumes were released digitally on July 14, 2020.

Volume list

Anime
An anime television series adaptation was announced on January 18, 2023. It is produced by Gekkō and directed by Kazuomi Koga, with scripts supervised by Yōhei Kashii, and character designs handled by Masato Katsumata. The series is set to premiere in 2023.

On March 19, 2023, Crunchyroll announced that they licensed the series outside of Asia.

Reception
As of November 2021, the series had over 1 million copies in circulation.

See also
 Grand Blue, another manga series illustrated by Kimitake Yoshioka

References

External links
  
  
 

2023 anime television series debuts
Anime series based on manga
Crunchyroll anime
Japanese webcomics
Kodansha manga
Romantic comedy anime and manga
Seinen manga
Upcoming anime television series
Webcomics in print